Metin Serezli (January 12, 1934 – March 10, 2013) was a Turkish stage, movie, TV series and voice actor as well as theatre director.

Biography
Metin Serezli was born on January 12, 1934. He was educated in Istanbul University's Faculty of Law, Institute of Journalism at Faculty of Economics and Art History at Faculty of Letters.

His acting career began with amateur theatre performances at the theatre club of the university. In 1971, he established his own theatre, "Çevre Tiyatrosu".

He married in 1957 Nisa Serezli. The couple divorced in 1964. Serezli made his second marriage on March 7, 1968, to Nevra Serezli, a theatre actress with whom he shared the stage many times. From this marriage they have two sons, Murat and Selim. Murat Serezli became also an actor.

Death
Serezli died in the morning hours of March 10, 2013, at his home following lung cancer he had been suffering from for about two years. He was survived by his wife Nevra and the two sons. According to his wife, Serezli did not wish a memorial ceremony. He was buried at the Zincirlikuyu Cemetery following a religious funeral held at the Teşvikiye Mosque two days later.

Awards 
 Best Theatre Director Award (1969)

Works

TV series
 Sihirli Annem (2011)
 Ay Işığı (2008)
 Palavra Aşklar (1995)
 Necip Fazıl Kısakürek (1988) 
 Kavanozdaki Adam (1987) 
 Olacak O Kadar (1986)

TV movies
 Yüzleşme (1996)
 Çılgin Sonbahar (1995)
 Beşten Yediye (1994)
 Özgürlüğün Bedeli (1977)

Movies

Dubbing

References

External links 
 Metin Serezli at Sinema Türk
 

1934 births
2013 deaths
Istanbul University alumni
Istanbul University Faculty of Law alumni
Turkish male stage actors
Turkish male television actors
Turkish male film actors
Turkish male voice actors
Deaths from lung cancer in Turkey
Burials at Zincirlikuyu Cemetery